Farewell to St. Petersburg  is a 1972 Soviet biopic film directed by Yan Frid. The film is about the Austrian composer Johann Strauss's stay in Russia, his concerts in Pavlovsk in the summer of 1857, and his love towards the Russian aristocrat Olga Smirnitskiy, to whom he dedicated several works.

Cast
Girt Yakovlev - Johann Strauss (voiced by Aleksandr Demyanenko)
Tatyana Bedova - Olga Smirnitskaya, Russian aristocrat
Tatyana Piletskaya - Natalia G. Smirnitskaya
Vasili Merkuryev - Leybrok
Pavel Kadochnikov - Pavel Maksimov
Igor Dmitriev - Grand Duke
Sergey Karnovich-Valois - manager
Yelena Anderegg as Olga Nikolayevna (as Ye. Anderegg)
Viktoriya Gorshenina
Pavel Kashlakov as Nechayev

Awards
Director Yan Frid received honorary diplomas at the Film Festival of Workers in Czechoslovakia (1973).

References

External links

Films directed by Yan Frid
1970s biographical drama films
Soviet biographical drama films
1970s musical drama films
Soviet musical drama films
Russian biographical drama films
1970s Russian-language films
1970s romantic musical films
Films set in the 19th century
Films about classical music and musicians
Films about composers
Biographical films about musicians
1972 drama films
1972 films